The 2004 NCAA Division II women's basketball tournament was the 23rd annual tournament hosted by the NCAA to determine the national champion of Division II women's  collegiate basketball in the United States.

California (PA) defeated Drury in the championship game, 75–72, to claim the Vulcans' first NCAA Division II national title.

As in 2003, the championship rounds were contested at the St. Joseph Civic Arena in St. Joseph, Missouri.

Ten teams made their first appearance in the NCAA Division II tournament: Anderson (SC), Ashland, Barton, Benedict, Christian Brothers, Fort Lewis, Holy Family, UC San Diego, USciences, and West Virginia State.

Regionals

East - California, Pennsylvania
Location: Hamer Hall Host: California University of Pennsylvania

Great Lakes - Quincy, Illinois
Location: Pepsi Arena Host: Quincy University

North Central - St. Paul, Minnesota
Location: Gangelhoff Center Host: Concordia University, St. Paul

Northeast - North Andover, Massachusetts
Location: Volpe Complex Host: Merrimack College

South - Winter Park, Florida
Location: Warden Arena at Harold & Ted Alfond Sports Center Host: Rollins College

South Atlantic - Raleigh, North Carolina
Location: Spaulding Gym Host: Shaw University

South Central - Springfield, Missouri
Location: Weiser Gymnasium Host: Drury University

West - Seattle, Washington
Location: Royal Brougham Pavilion Host: Seattle Pacific University

Elite Eight - St. Joseph, Missouri
Location: St. Joseph Civic Arena Host: Missouri Western State College

All-tournament team
 Megan Storck, California (PA)
 Sara McKinney, California (PA)
 Jill Curry, Drury
 Amanda Newton, Drury
 Kara Rutledge, Drury

See also
 2004 NCAA Division I women's basketball tournament
 2004 NCAA Division III women's basketball tournament
 2004 NAIA Division I women's basketball tournament
 2004 NAIA Division II women's basketball tournament
 2004 NCAA Division II men's basketball tournament

References
 2004 NCAA Division II women's basketball tournament jonfmorse.com

 
NCAA Division II women's basketball tournament
2004 in sports in Missouri